Vrhovljan is a village in northern Croatia, part of the Sveti Martin na Muri municipality within Međimurje County.

History

Vrhovljan is first time mentioned in charter issued in year 1478 as Worhoblan. Roman Catholic chapel in Vrhovljan was built in the 1830s.

Geography

Vrhovljan is located in part of Međimurje called Gornje Međimurje. Village is about 18 kilometres northwest from Čakovec, and some 110 kilometres north of Zagreb.
Settlement is situated in the alluvial plane of river Mur, on rivers right bank.

Vrhovljan had a population of 291 in 2011 census. Village is experiencing population decline since 2000s.

Economy

In Vrhovljan is located business zone with 13 companies. Companies are mainly engaged in metal industry.

References

Populated places in Međimurje County